The 1951-52 French Rugby Union Championship was contested by 64 teams divided in 8 pools. Thirty-two teams were qualified to play a second phase with eight pools of four clubs. The best two from each pool were qualified to play the "last 16".

The Championship was won by Lourdes beating l'Perpignan in the final.

Context 
In 1952,  France, was threatened with exclusion from the Five Nation Championship responsible by the British of "professionalism".

To avoid this sanction, the French Federation promised to abolish the championship and created a list of players accused of professionalism including Jean Dauger, Robert Soro and Maurice Siman.

The exclusion was avoided but the championship is maintained cause the pressure of the clubs.

FFR in any case decided to reduce the number of matches played during the season, cancelling the Coupe de France.

For the first (and last) time, the club excluded from the qualification round, played a consolation tournament called Coupe Cyril-Rutherford in memory of a French rugby pioneer.

The 1952 Five Nations Championship was won by Wales, France finished fourth.

France won the first edition of European Cup, beating Italy in the final.

Le Challenge Yves du Manoir was won by Pau.

 Second qualification round 

The teams qualifying for the "last 16" phase are in bold Last 16 

The teams qualifying for the quarterfinals are in bold.

 Quarterfinals 

The teams qualifying for the semifinals are in bold'.

Semifinals

Final

References

External links
 Compte rendu de la finale de 1952, sur lnr.fr

]

1952
France 1952
Championship